Divarilima sydneyensis is a species of bivalve mollusc in the family Limidae, the file shells or file clams. It is the type species of its genus.

References 
 SealifeBase
 PaleoDB
 

Limidae
Bivalves of New Zealand
Bivalves of Australia
Molluscs described in 1904